Edwards House or Edwards Farm or The Edwards House may refer to:

W.A. Edwards House, Evening Shade, Arkansas, listed on the National Register of Historic Places (NRHP) in Sharp County, Arkansas
 Frank G. Edwards House, San Francisco, California, listed on the NRHP in San Francisco, California
Davis-Edwards House, Monroe, Georgia, listed on the NRHP in Walton County, Georgia
Edwards-Gillette Barn, Cambridge, Idaho, listed on the NRHP in Washington County, Idaho
Shirk-Edwards House, Peru, Indiana, listed on the NRHP in Miami County, Indiana
Edwards-Swayze House, Nevada, Iowa, listed on the NRHP in Story County, Iowa
David Edwards House, Exie, Kentucky, listed on the NRHP in Green County, Kentucky
 Edwards House (Exie, Kentucky), listed on the NRHP in Green County, Kentucky
Thomas Edwards House and Quarters, Tyrone, Kentucky, listed on the NRHP in Woodford County, Kentucky
 Edwards House (Walton, Kentucky), listed on the NRHP in Boone County, Kentucky
Rock S. Edwards Farmstead, Sodus, Michigan, listed on the NRHP in Berrien County, Michigan
Scott-Edwards House, Staten Island, New York, NRHP-listed
John B. and Lydia Edwards House, Oswego, New York, NRHP-listed
The Edwards House (Sayville, New York), listed on the NRHP in Islip, New York
Adams-Edwards House, Raleigh, North Carolina, listed on the NRHP in Woodford County, North Carolina
John Edwards House, Leipsic, Ohio, NRHP-listed
William Edwards Farmhouse, Newtown, Ohio, NRHP-listed
John Stark Edwards House, Warren, Ohio, listed on the NRHP in Trumbull County, Ohio
Walter J. and Frances W. Edwards House, Oklahoma City, Oklahoma, listed on the NRHP in Oklahoma County, Oklahoma
Jesse Edwards House, Newberg, Oregon, NRHP-listed
J. G. Edwards House, Portland, Oregon, NRHP-listed
Delaney-Edwards House, Salem, Oregon, listed on the NRHP in Oregon
Broadus Edwards House, Batesburg, South Carolina, NRHP-listed
Simmons-Edwards House, Charleston, South Carolina, NRHP-listed
Wilds-Edwards House, Darlington, South Carolina, NRHP-listed
Thompsie Edwards House, Lexington, Tennessee, listed on the NRHP in Henderson County, Tennessee
Edwards-Fowler House, Lake City, Tennessee, listed on the NRHP in Anderson County, Tennessee
Joel Edwards House, Port Townsend, Washington, listed on the NRHP in Jefferson County, Washington
William H. & William S. Edwards House, Coalburg, West Virginia, NRHP-listed

See also
 Edward House (disambiguation)